April De Angelis (born April 1960) is an English dramatist of part Sicilian descent. She is a graduate of Sussex University who trained at East 15 Acting School.

De Angelis began her career in the 1980s as an actress with the Monstrous Regiment theatre company.

In 1987, her play Breathless was a prize winner at the 1987 Second Wave Young Women's Writing Festival.

Her plays often feature historical figures. Playhouse Creatures and A Laughing Matter are set in the London theatrical milieu of the 17th and 18th centuries respectively. Wanderlust examines Victorian colonialism and Ironmistress is a verse play exploring Lady Charlotte Guest's factory ownership.

As a librettist, De Angelis contributed to the opera The Silent Twins (2007), composed by Errollyn Wallen, which is based on the case of June and Jennifer Gibbons.

De Angelis tends to write to commission and several of her plays have been produced by Max Stafford-Clark's Out of Joint theatre company.

Plays

Breathless (1987)
Women in Law (1988)
Wanderlust (1988, Oval House Theatre Women's Workshop)
Visitants (1988)
Ironmistress (1989, Young Vic Theatre)
Crux (1989, Paines Plough)
Frankenstein (1989)
The Life and Times of Fanny Hill (1991, Red Shift Theatre Company)
Hush (1992, Royal Court Theatre)
Greed (1993)
Soft Vengeance (1993) (from the book by Albie Sachs)
Playhouse Creatures (Haymarket Theatre 1993)
The Positive Hour (1997, Out of Joint theatre company / Hampstead Theatre)
A Warwickshire Testimony (1999, Royal Shakespeare Company)
A Laughing Matter (2002, Out of Joint theatre company)
Headstrong (2004, Royal National Theatre Shell Connections)
Wild East (2005, Royal Court Theatre)
Catch (with Stella Feehily, Tanika Gupta, Chloe Moss and Laura Wade) (2007, Royal Court Theatre)
Wuthering Heights (2008) (From the book by Emily Brontë)
Jumpy (2011)
After Electra (2015)
 My Brilliant Friend (2017) (from the Neapolitan Novels by Elena Ferrante)
Wilderness (2019)
Kerry Jackson (2020)

Libretti
Pig
Flight
Silent Twins (2007)

References

English women dramatists and playwrights
Living people
Place of birth missing (living people)
1960 births
English opera librettists
English people of Sicilian descent
Alumni of the University of Sussex
Alumni of East 15 Acting School
Women opera librettists
20th-century English dramatists and playwrights
20th-century English women writers
21st-century British dramatists and playwrights
21st-century English women writers